Nader Pourmand  is a Professor of Biomolecular Engineering leading the Biosensors and Bioelectrical Technology Group at the Baskin School of Engineering at the University of California Santa Cruz, Baskin School of Engineering.

He has been published in Cancer Research, PLoS ONE, ACS, and the Proceedings of the National Academy of Sciences.

Pourmand received his PhD at the Karolinska Institute, Stockholm, Sweden. While he was at Stanford, his lab developed the science underlying Ion Torrent, a benchtop next-gen sequencing system (acquired by Life Technologies, then by Thermo-Fischer). He has been a cofounder of start-ups Pinpoint Science inc., BioStinger Inc. (now part of Yokogawa, Japan), MagArray Inc., and contributed to others including Nvigen, Ion Torrent, Bioprobix, and Pathogenix.

He has developed technology based on functionalized nanopipettes, which can be used to study genomics and proteomics of individual living cells at nanoscale. This nanopipette technology was described in Nature Nanotechnology as a major advance in Single cell genomics and was recognized by the NIH for the development of this technology for interrogating single living cells. This same nanopipette technology is the basis for Pinpoint Science Inc's handheld diagnostic platform for detecting microbial pathogens.

Awards 

 2001: Second place prize for Technologies in the Stanford Entrepreneur's Challenge.
 2015: NIH winner of the NIH's “Follow that Cell Challenge”.
 2017: NIH as 2017 First Prize winner of the NIH's “Follow that Cell Challenge”.

References

External links
 UCSC faculty biography

Year of birth missing (living people)
Living people
American molecular biologists
University of California, Santa Cruz faculty
American company founders
Stanford University alumni
Iranian expatriate academics